Lucius Tarquinius Priscus, or Tarquin the Elder, was the legendary fifth king of Rome and first of its Etruscan dynasty. He reigned for thirty-eight years. Tarquinius expanded Roman power through military conquest and grand architectural constructions. His wife was the prophetess Tanaquil. 

Not much is known about the early life of Lucius Tarquinius Priscus. According to Livy, Tarquin came from Etruria. After inheriting his father's entire fortune, Lucius attempted to gain a political office. However, he was prohibited from obtaining political office in Tarquinii because of the ethnicity of his father, Demaratus, who came from the Greek city of Corinth. As a result, his wife Tanaquil advised him to relocate to Rome. Legend has it that on his arrival in Rome in a chariot, an eagle took his cap, flew away and then returned it back upon his head. Tanaquil, who was skilled in prophecy, interpreted this as an omen of his future greatness. In Rome, he attained respect through his courtesy. King Ancus Marcius noticed Tarquinius and, by his will, appointed Tarquinius guardian of his own sons.

King of Rome

Rise to power 
Although Ancus Marcius was the grandson of Numa Pompilius, the second King of Rome, the principle of hereditary monarchy was not yet established at Rome; none of the first three kings had been succeeded by their sons, and each subsequent king had been acclaimed by the people.  Upon the death of Marcius, Tarquin addressed the Comitia Curiata and convinced them that he should be elected king over Marcius' natural sons, who were still only youths, making him the first Roman king to ever actively succeed at lobbying for the throne. In one tradition, the sons were away on a hunting expedition at the time of their father's death, and were thus unable to affect the assembly's choice.

Political reform 
According to Livy, Tarquin increased the number of the Senate to 300 by adding one hundred men from the leading minor families.  Among these was the family of the Octavii, from whom the first emperor, Augustus, was descended. He did so with the hope that those added to the Senate would be grateful for their position and thus loyal to him, strengthening his rule as king.

Military conquest 
Lucius Tarquinius Priscus is accredited with expanding Rome's borders. He did so through conquest of the surrounding tribes. Those tribes were the Latins, Sabines, and Etruscans.

War with the Latins 
Tarquin's first war was waged against the Latins. Tarquinius took the Latin town of Apiolae by storm and took great booty from there back to Rome.  According to the Fasti Triumphales, this war must have occurred prior to 588 BC. The Latins claimed that peace treaties developed by Romulus and the other Roman kings no longer applied and as such, launched the first set of attacks. Seeing the opportunity to incorporate the Latins into Rome's ranks, Tarquin quickly responded by conquering multiple Latin cities. As a result, the Latins requested help from the Sabines and Etruscans. Choosing not to split up his military power, Tarquin chose to keep the attack on the Latins, leading to a Roman victory.

War with the Sabines 
After conquering the Latins Tarquin began his assault on the Sabines. Having their basecamp at the corner of two rivers, the Sabines were able to move their troops quickly and efficiently. Using his military cunning Tarquin chose to launch a surprise attack on the base at night. He did this by setting a fleet of small boats aflame and then sending them down the river to set the Sabine camp on fire. While the Sabines' were focused on dousing the flames, Tarquin and his troops moved in to dismantle the camp.

Later, his military ability was then tested by an attack from the Sabines. Tarquin doubled the numbers of equites to help the war effort. The Sabines were defeated after difficult street fighting in the city of Rome.  In the peace negotiations that followed, Tarquin received the town of Collatia, and appointed his nephew, Arruns Tarquinius, better known as Egerius, as commander of the garrison there. Tarquin returned to Rome and celebrated a triumph on September 13, 585 BC.

Subsequently, the Latin cities of Corniculum, old Ficulea, Cameria, Crustumerium, Ameriola, Medullia, and Nomentum were subdued and became Roman.

War with the Etruscans 
Tarquin also wished to seek peace with the Etruscans, but they refused. Since Tarquin had kept the captured Etruscan auxiliaries prisoners for meddling in the war with the Sabines, the five Etruscan cities who had taken part declared war on Rome.  Seven other Etruscan cities joined forces with them. The Etruscans soon captured the Roman colony at Fidenae, which thereupon became the focal point of the war.  After several bloody battles, Tarquin was once again victorious, and he subjugated the Etruscan cities who had taken part in the war.  At the successful conclusion of each of his wars, Rome was enriched by Tarquin's plunder.

Construction 

Tarquin is said to have built the Circus Maximus, the first and largest stadium at Rome, for chariot racing. The Circus Maximus started out as an underwhelming piece of land, but was built into a grand and beautiful stadium. Raised seating was erected privately by the senators and equites, and other areas were marked out for private citizens. There the king established a series of annual games; according to Livy, the first horses and boxers to participate were brought from Etruria. It received the name Circus Maximus as a way to set it apart from the other stadiums built at this time in a similar fashion.

After a great flood, Tarquin drained the damp lowlands of Rome by constructing the Cloaca Maxima, Rome's great sewer. The arch was constructed in 578 B.C and stole inspiration from Etruscan structures of the earlier period.  He also constructed a stone wall around the city, and began the construction of a temple in honour of Jupiter Optimus Maximus on the Capitoline Hill.  The latter is said to have been funded in part by the plunder seized from the Sabines.

Shows of triumph 
Tarquinius was the first Roman ruler to ever celebrate a Roman triumph. According to Florus, Tarquin celebrated his triumphs in the Etruscan fashion, riding a golden chariot drawn by four horses, while wearing a gold-embroidered toga and the tunica palmata, a tunic upon which palm-leaves were embroidered.  He also introduced other Etruscan insignia of civilian authority and military distinction: the sceptre of the king; the trabea, a purple garment that varied in form, but was perhaps most often used as a mantle; the fasces carried by the lictors; the curule chair; the toga praetexta, later worn by various magistrates and officials; the rings worn by senators; the paludamentum, a cloak associated with military command; and the phalera, a disc of metal worn on a soldier's breastplate during parades, or displayed on the standards of various military units.  Strabo reports that Tarquin introduced Etruscan sacrificial and divinatory rites, as well as the tuba, a straight horn used chiefly for military purposes. As a result, most classical Roman symbols for war harken back to his time as king.

Death and succession
Tarquin is said to have reigned for thirty-eight years.  According to legend, the sons of his predecessor, Ancus Marcius, believed that the throne should have been theirs.  They arranged the king's assassination, disguised as a riot, during which Tarquin received a fatal blow to the head by an ax. However, the queen, Tanaquil, gave out that the king was merely wounded, and took advantage of the confusion to establish Servius Tullius as regent; when the death of Tarquin was confirmed, Tullius became king, in place of Marcius' sons, or those of Tarquin.

Tullius, said to have been the son of Servius Tullius, a prince of Corniculum who had fallen in battle against Tarquin, was brought to the palace as a child with his mother, Ocreisia. According to legend, Tanaquil discovered his potential for greatness by means of various omens, and therefore preferred him to her own sons. Tullius married Tarquinia, one of Priscus daughters, thus providing a vital link between the families. Tullius' own daughters were subsequently married to the king's sons (or, in some traditions, grandsons), Lucius and Arruns.

Most ancient writers regarded Tarquin as the father of Lucius Tarquinius Superbus, the seventh and last King of Rome, but some stated that the younger Tarquin was his grandson.  As the younger Tarquin died about 496 BC, more than eighty years after Tarquinius Priscus, chronology seems to support the latter tradition.  An Etruscan legend related by the emperor Claudius equates Servius Tullius with Macstarna (apparently the Etruscan equivalent of the Latin magister), a companion of the Etruscan heroes Aulus and Caelius Vibenna, who helped free the brothers from captivity, slaying their captors, including a Roman named Gnaeus Tarquinius.  This episode is depicted in a fresco at the tomb of the Etruscan Saties family at Vulci, now known as the François Tomb.  This tradition suggests that perhaps the sons of the elder Tarquin attempted to seize power, but were defeated by the regent, Servius Tullius, and his companions; Tullius would then have attempted to end the dynastic struggle by marrying his daughters to the grandsons of Tarquinius Priscus.  However, this plan ultimately failed, as Tullius was himself assassinated at the instigation of his son-in-law, who succeeded him.

See also
 Lucius Tarquinius Superbus, seventh and final king of Rome
 Tarquinia gens

Notes

References
 Livy, Ab urbe condita 
 Florus, Epitoma de Tito Livio bellorum omnium annorum DCC 
 Eutropius, Breviarium historiae romanae

External links 
 Stemma Tarquiniorum, Tarquinius family tree

579 BC deaths
7th-century BC Romans
7th-century BC monarchs
Kings of Rome
6th-century BC Romans
6th-century BC monarchs
Etruscan kings
Year of birth unknown
Tarquinii